Sign of the Sun is a 1997 adventure video game from Project Two Interactive.

Gameplay

The game consists of 150 different locations including vast lava caverns. During the course of the game the player encounters talking stones, flying lizards, various gate mechanisms as well as puzzles that the player must solve.

Plot
James Mariner flew his spaceship too close to the sun and was captured by a tractor beam. He finds himself under the solar surface and has to escape to stop the natives from destroying the Galaxy.

Reception

PC Zone gave the Sign of the Sun a score of 41 out of 100, wishing that the game had more characters to interact with and more content to complete. PC Player gave the game a score of 21 out of 100, criticizing the controls and action sequences.

References

1997 video games
Adventure games
DOS games
Fiction about the Sun
Science fiction video games
Video games about extraterrestrial life
Video games set in outer space